Kendlerstraße  is a station on  of the Vienna U-Bahn. It is located in the Ottakring District. It opened in 1998.

References

External links 
 

Buildings and structures in Ottakring
Railway stations opened in 1998
1998 establishments in Austria
Vienna U-Bahn stations
Railway stations in Austria opened in the 20th century